Abell is an English surname, from the given name Abel. Notable people with the surname include:

Abraham Abell (1789–1851), Irish antiquarian
Sir Anthony Abell (1906–1994), British colonial official, Governor of Sarawak
Adam Abell (c.1480–c.1540), Scottish friar
Alexander G. Abell (1818–1890), American diplomat and writer
Alistair Abell, Canadian voice actor
Arunah Shepherdson Abell (1806–1888), American publisher
Ben Abell (born 1932), American meteorologist
Bud Abell (born 1940), American football player
Chris Abell (born 1957), British biological chemist
David Abell (disambiguation), several people
Derek F. Abell (born 1938), American businessman and educator
Earl Abell (1892–1956), American football player
Ferdinand Abell (died 1928), American businessman
George Abell (disambiguation), several people
Irvin Abell (1876–1949), American surgeon
Joey Abell (born 1981), American heavyweight boxer
John Abell (1653–c.1724), Scottish musician and composer
John Abell (cricketer) (1931–2004), English cricketer
Kjeld Abell (1901–1961), Danish dramatist
Louis Abell (1884–1962), American Olympic rower
Peter Abell (born 1939), British social scientist
Richard Abell (c.1688–after 1744), British politician
Robert Abell (c.1605–1663), colonial American immigrant and pioneer
Roy Abell (born 1931), English cricketer and artist
Sam Abell (born 1945), American photographer
Stig Abell (born 1980), British journalist
Thomas Abel (or Abell) (c.1497–1540), English priest and martyr
Timothy Abell (born 1930), English cricketer
Tom Abell (born 1994), English cricketer
Walter Abell (1897–1956), American art teacher and theoretician
William Abell, (c.1584–c.1655) English vintner
Westcott Stile Abell, (1877-1961), British naval architect

See also 
Abel (surname)